Kufri is a resort hill station in the district of Shimla, India. It is located 18km from the state capital Shimla on the National Highway No. 05.  On the Kufri Avenue, the main thoroughfare, boutiques and restaurants mix with Indian-style hotels and souvenir shops are to look for during a visit.

The name Kufri is derived from the word kufr meaning "lake" in the local language. The highest point in the surrounding region, Kufri has a Himalayan wildlife zoo which hosts rare antelopes, felines and birds including the  Himalayan monal, the state bird of Himachal Pradesh until 2007. During winter a meandering path through the potato plantations turns into a popular ski track. Kufri has three amuesment parks, horse riding, yak riding, adventure activities, highest go-karting track, traditional dress photography experience, jeep riding, a dense forest and winter snow activities, which makes Kufri the Biggest Tourist Place of district Shimla.

Geography
It has an average elevation of 2,720 metres (8923 feet).

History
The region around Shimla including Kufri was once a part of the Kingdom of Nepal until the area was ceded to the British Raj as part of the Sugauli Treaty. This region remained obscure from the rest of the world until the British 'discovered' it in 1819.

Places of interest
Kufri Fun Campus an amusement park to enjoy the whole day. This park is equipped with various rides, pools and world's highest go-kart track.

Kufri to the Mahasu Peak- the highest peak in Kufri.

Indira Tourist Park
The Indira Tourist Park is near the Himalayan Nature Park and provides panoramic view of the locations around.

Chini Bungalow
It is the Kufri bungalow which is very famous for its statues and architecture.

Gallery

References

External links

 

Ski areas and resorts in India
Hill stations in Himachal Pradesh
Shimla district